The 2018 IIHF Women's Challenge Cup of Asia was an international women's ice hockey tournament run by the International Ice Hockey Federation. The tournament took place between 8 March and 11 March 2018 in Kuala Lumpur, Malaysia and was the sixth edition held since its formation in 2010 under the IIHF Challenge Cup of Asia series of tournaments. Chinese Taipei's under-18 team won the tournament after winning all three of their round-robin games and finishing first in the standings. The New Zealand under-18 team finished in second place and Thailand finished third.

Overview
The 2018 IIHF Women's Challenge Cup of Asia began on 8 March 2018 in Kuala Lumpur, Malaysia with games played at the Malaysia National Ice Skating Stadium (MyNISS). The Women's competition was split into two tournaments for 2018 due to the increase from seven to eight teams. The defending champions New Zealand's under-18 team (New Zealand U18), Thailand and Singapore returned after finishing in the top three of the 2017 tournament. Chinese Taipei's under-18 team (Chinese Taipei U18) was included as the fourth team in the competition, making their debut in women's under-18 international competition. India, the Philippines, the United Arab Emirates and Malaysia, who finished fourth through to seventh in 2017, were placed into the newly created Division I tournament. Both 2018 tournaments ran alongside each other with all games being held at the Malaysia National Ice Skating Stadium.

The tournament consisted of a single round-robin with each team competing in three games. Chinese Taipei U18 won the tournament after winning all three of their games and finished first in the standings. New Zealand U18 finished second after losing only to Chinese Taipei U18 and Thailand finished in third. Thailand's Nuchanat Ponglerkdee and New Zealand's Harriet Fuller led the tournament in scoring with eight points each with Ponglerkdee also being named the most valuable player. Wasunun Angkulpattanasuk of Thailand finished as the tournaments leading goaltender with a save percentage of 94.12 and was awarded best goaltender by the IIHF Directorate. Chinese Taipei's Hsuan Wang was named best forward and Sirikarn Jittresin of Thailand was named best defenceman.

Standings
The final standings of the tournament.

Fixtures
All times are local. (MST – UTC+8)

Scoring leaders
List shows the top ten skaters sorted by points, then goals, assists, and the lower penalties in minutes.

Leading goaltenders
Only the top goaltenders, based on save percentage, who have played at least 40% of their team's minutes are included in this list.

See also
2018 IIHF Women's Challenge Cup of Asia Division I

References

External links
Tournament page at IIHF.com

IIHF Women's Challenge Cup of Asia
IIHF Women's Challenge Cup of Asia
IIHF Women's Challenge Cup of Asia
IIHF Women's Challenge Cup of Asia
International ice hockey competitions hosted by Malaysia
March 2018 sports events in Asia